Danger UXB is a 1979 British ITV television series set during the Second World War. It was developed by John Hawkesworth and starred Anthony Andrews as Lieutenant Brian Ash, an officer in the Royal Engineers (RE).

The series chronicles the exploits of the fictional 97 Tunnelling Company, which has been made a bomb disposal unit, and specifically 347 Section of the company, to deal with the thousands of unexploded bombs ("UXBs") in London during the Blitz. As with all his fellow officers, Ash must for the most part learn the techniques and procedures of disarming and destroying the UXBs through experience, repeatedly confronted with more cunning and deadlier technological advances in aerial bomb fuzing. The series primarily features military storylines, though among them is a romantic thread featuring an inventor's married daughter, Susan Mount (Judy Geeson), with whom Ash falls in love, and other human interest vignettes.

The programme was partly based on Unexploded Bomb - The Story of Bomb Disposal, the memoirs of Major A. B. Hartley, MBE, RE; its episodes were written by Hawkesworth and four screenwriters. The series was filmed in 1978 in and around the Clapham, Streatham and Tooting areas of south London. Lt. Col. E. E. Gooch, RE (AER), rtd. was the technical adviser.

The programme appeared on the US PBS as a segment of Masterpiece Theatre from 4 January to 5 April 1981. It was also screened in Australia by the public broadcaster ABC Television, and in New Zealand by Television New Zealand.

Cast
347 Section, 97 Company
Anthony Andrews as Lieutenant Brian Ash, section bomb disposal officer
Maurice Roëves as Sergeant James, section sergeant
Ken Kitson as Corporal Samuel Horrocks, a large but timid section NCO
Kenneth Cranham as Lance Corporal Jack Salt, a married man anxious about the safety of his wife and children
George Innes as Sapper Jim Wilkins, section driver, a conniving petty thief and scrounger who avoids work as much as he can
Gordon Kane as Sapper Gordon Mulley, also Ash's batman. He falls in love with the landlady's daughter.
Robert Pugh as Sapper 'Tiny' Powell, a coarse and often bullying Welshman who plays the piano
Robert Longden as Sapper Copping, a religious and contemplative young man
David Auker as Sapper Baines
Martin Neil as Private John Brinckley, a replacement from the Non-Combatant Corps later commissioned into the Royal Engineers as a bomb disposal officer
John Bowler as Sapper Scott, a replacement
Bryan Burdon as Sapper Binns, a replacement who in peacetime was a stage actor and comedian

97 Company, Royal Engineers
Peter Cartwright as Major Luckhurst, officer commanding
Ken Farrington as Captain 'Fannie' Francis, second-in-command (2IC) and later officer commanding
Royston Tickner as Lieutenant (later Captain) Hamish Leckie, company adjutant and Scottish veteran of the First World War
Jeremy Sinden as Lieutenant (later Major) Ivor Rodgers, Ash's good friend, later 2IC and officer commanding
Steven Grives as Lieutenant Ken Machin, a replacement bomb disposal officer
Osmund Bullock as Lieutenant (later Captain) Alan Pringle, section officer and later 2IC
David Shaughnessy as 2nd Lieutenant Tim Carter-Brown, section officer
Nick Brimble as Lieutenant Gresham, section officer and junior officer in the company
Norman Chappell as Corporal Mould, mess corporal, who is constantly teased by Ivor Rodgers

Others
Iain Cuthbertson as Doctor Gillespie, a boffin specialising in defeating German bomb fuses
Judy Geeson as Susan Mount, Gillespie's married daughter
David Buck as Stephen Mount, Susan's codebreaker husband
Moyra Fraser as Aunt Do-Do, Brian's surrogate mother
Marjie Lawrence as Mrs Baker, landlady of Brian's billet
Deborah Watling as Norma, Mrs Baker's daughter and Sapper Mulley's paramour
David Wood as Lieutenant Roger Symes, 81 Company RE section officer
Christopher Good as Captain West, RE
Nick Tate as Lieutenant Chris Craik, Royal Navy, a bomb disposal officer specialising in naval mines
Tim Pigott-Smith as Harry Winthrop, Dr Gillespie's associate at Cambridge
Deborah Grant as Elspeth, Brian's paramour while stationed at Cambridge
Geraldine Gardner as Mickey, a cabaret dancer who is attracted to Lance Corporal Salt

Episodes
The series was first broadcast between 8 January and 2 April 1979 on Monday nights at 21:00.

Books
Hartley's book, a non-fiction memoir of technical information and anecdotes, provided some of the major story developments. Danger UXB, a novel based on the series and written by Michael Booker, was published by Pan Books in 1978, and an annual was published by World Distributors in 1980.

A non-fiction book titled Danger UXB by Melanie Jappy was published in 2001 by Macmillan. It was based on the two-part Channel 4 documentary series Danger Unexploded Bomb (15-22 February 2001), rather than the drama series. However, many of the dramatic incidents shown in the series turn out to be based on actual cases. (For example, the incident with one bomb in a schoolyard and another in a garden that cost Ken Machin his life is covered on pages 78 and 79. The liquid-oxygen fire in "Dead Letter" while Ash was defusing the Type Y fuse is covered on pages 152 and 153. Chapter 8 covers the Grimsby Raid of June 13, 1943, which forms the basis for "Butterfly Winter" and includes the development of the string-and-pulley system for moving the SD2s about, the bombs in the bean field, and the inspiration for Sergeant James being blown off the stone wall and breaking his arm. And pages 187 and 188 recount the inspiration for "The Pier" and Brian Ash's serious injuries.)

Production

Many of the bomb-disposal scenes were filmed in what appeared to be deep, freshly dug holes lined with wooden shoring (the way real bomb disposal often happened). In fact, these scenes were shot using two different physical sets intercut: a short above-ground wooden fence that appeared to be the top of the shaft down to the bomb (but was not in fact excavated); and a 30-foot above-ground hollow wooden tower with a muddy area inside at the bottom (often shot from above, looking down). A side of the bottom was also removable to facilitate "bottom-of-shaft" close-ups.

Notes
Footnotes

Citations

References
 oclc 6456857.
Salmon, Gregor (2012). Navy Divers. Sydney: Read How You Want Press. 
Budiansky, Stephen (2010). "The Horticulturalist Who Disarmed Bombs After the Blitz" History Net.com from World War II magazine.
 
 .

External links
 
 Danger UXB, Part One, review 27 April 2013 by Mathew Kilburn, The St. James Evening Post

ITV television dramas
World War II television drama series
1979 British television series debuts
1979 British television series endings
1970s British drama television series
British military television series
Television shows produced by Thames Television
English-language television shows
Television series by Euston Films
Fiction about bomb disposal